The Arctic lamprey (Lethenteron camtschaticum), also known as the Japanese river lamprey or Japanese lampern (Petromyzon japonicus Martens 1868, Lampetra fluviatilis japonica (Martens 1868), Lampetra japonica (Martens 1868), Lethenteron japonicum (Martens 1868) ), is a species of lamprey, a jawless fish in the order Petromyzontiformes. It inhabits coastal freshwater habitat types in the Arctic. Some populations are anadromous, spending part of their lives in the ocean. It is the most common and widespread lamprey in the Arctic region.

Description
It is brown, gray, or olive in color with a paler belly. There are two dorsal fins located near the tail, the posterior one larger than the anterior. Males are larger than females. The caudal fin has two lobes, the lower longer than the upper. It is continuous with the dorsal and anal fins. The anal fin of the male takes the form of a small ridge.

Distribution and habitat
The Arctic lamprey is a circumpolar species. Its range extends from Lapland eastward to Kamchatka and southward to Japan and Korea. It also inhabits the Arctic and Pacific drainages of Alaska and northwestern Canada. The adults live in freshwater habitat near the coast, such as rivers and lakes. It can be found over stony and sandy substrates, and shelters under vegetation.

Behaviour
The adult Arctic lamprey spawns in the gravel of riffles. The ammocoetes, as the lamprey larvae are known, are found in muddy freshwater habitats where they burrow in the mud and feed on detritus. It is generally an anadromous species, living in the ocean before migrating to fresh water to spawn, but some populations are permanent residents of fresh water.

The adult is generally a parasitic feeder that attaches to any of a number of other fish species, including salmon, lake trout, and lake whitefish. The smaller, non-migratory form is not parasitic. The juvenile consumes aquatic invertebrates, algae, and organic debris. This species is prey for other fish such as inconnu, northern pike, and burbot, and gulls feed on spawning aggregations. The eggs and larvae are food for sculpins.

Status
The Arctic lamprey is a commercially important edible fish with fatty flesh. It is reared in aquaculture. The ammocoetes are used as bait. Threats to the spawning habitat of this species include pollution and the regulation of water flow by damming. Nevertheless, the IUCN has assessed this species as being of "Least Concern".

References

Lethenteron
Freshwater fish of the Arctic
Animal parasites of fish
Fish described in 1811
Taxa named by Wilhelm Gottlieb Tilesius von Tilenau
Holarctic fauna